The relationship between Sahrawi Arab Democratic Republic and Arab Republic of Syria is regarded as a close-range relations between two countries.

History
Syria, historically, has provided political support to the Polisario, a Western Saharan-oriented group fighting against Morocco. This has prompted tensions between Morocco and Syria, which had already declined since the 1960s. Syria's close ties with Iran also gave impetus for the tensions, a fact which contributed to Syria's support to Polisario and Western Saharans against Morocco. Syria remains firmly on Western Sahara's side and has officially recognized SADR.

Syrian Civil War

The Syrian Civil War has created divisions between two groups. The exiled Syrian opposition, backed by anti-Assad allies including Morocco, had been instrumental on voicing in favor to Morocco's integrity. Meanwhile, the Syrian Government led by Bashar al-Assad maintained its support for Polisario and Western Saharan cause.

Algeria allegedly allowed Polisario fighters to fight in Syria on behalf of Assad's request. And with the going end of the Syrian Civil War, and Assad's prevail, the relations would be expected to bear more fruits as Assad has remained firmly recognized to Western Saharan cause.

References

 
Syria
Sahrawi Arab Democratic Republic